Ciprian Bogdan Popescu (born 23 March 2004) is a Romanian professional footballer who plays as a forward.

Club career

Rapid București
He made his debut on 18 December 2021 for Rapid București in Liga I match against FC Botoșani.

Career statistics

Club

References

External links

 Ciprian Popescu at lpf.ro

2004 births
Living people
Footballers from Bucharest
Romanian footballers
Association football forwards
Liga I players
Romania youth international footballers
FC Rapid București players